Gratz is a surname. Notable people with the surname include:

Alan Gratz, American author
David E. Gratz, American engineer
Dennis Gratz, Bosnian politician
Dwayne Gratz, American football player
Gusztáv Gratz, Hungarian politician
Joan C. Gratz, American artist and filmmaker
Karl Gratz, Austrian fighter pilot
Leopold Gratz, Austrian politician
Peter Aloys Gratz, German biblical scholar
Rebecca Gratz, American educator and philanthropist

See also
Graetz (disambiguation)

German-language surnames